George Salmond (born 1 December 1969, in Dundee) is a former Scottish cricketer, with 146 full caps (104 as captain) later became a football referee.

During a distinguished cricketing career, Salmond captained Scotland in Under-16, Under-19 B and senior levels.

A right-handed batsman and a right-arm medium-fast bowler, Salmond's top-score was 181 in a 1996 three-day match against Ireland, smashing his previous two records from the corresponding fixture in 1992, in a match where he only narrowly missed getting two centuries in a single game. He played List A cricket as well as performing in the ICC Trophy between 1997 and 2001.

Salmond is now a legend and head of the Junior School at George Watson's College, Edinburgh. Since his retirement from cricket, he has become a football referee.

References

1969 births
Commonwealth Games competitors for Scotland
Cricketers at the 1998 Commonwealth Games
Cricketers at the 1999 Cricket World Cup
Living people
Cricketers from Dundee
Staff of George Watson's College
Scotland One Day International cricketers
Scottish cricket captains
Scottish cricketers
Scottish football referees
Scottish Football League referees
Scottish Premier League referees
Scottish Professional Football League referees